This article is a list of historic places in the City of Ottawa, Ontario entered on the Canadian Register of Historic Places, whether they are federal, provincial, or municipal.

See also List of historic places in Ontario.

List of historic places

See also
List of designated heritage properties in Ottawa

References

Ottawa
Buildings and structures in Ottawa